Vinko Globokar (born 7 July 1934) is a French-Slovenian avant-garde composer and trombonist.

Globokar's music uses unconventional and extended techniques, places great emphasis on spontaneity and creativity, and often relies on improvisation. His extensive output is largely unknown outside of experimental music circles.

As a trombonist, he has premiered works by Luciano Berio, Mauricio Kagel, René Leibowitz, Karlheinz Stockhausen, and Toru Takemitsu, as well as his own compositions.

Biography
Globokar was born in Anderny, Meurthe-et-Moselle, France. In 1947 he moved to Yugoslavia, where he attended DIC in Ljubljana, Slovenia. Here, he played jazz trombone until 1955, at which point he moved to Paris to study at the Conservatoire de Paris. At the Conservatoire, he studied composition with René Leibowitz (a disciple of Arnold Schoenberg) and trombone with André Lafosse. In 1965, he moved to Berlin and began composition lessons with Luciano Berio, whose Sequenza V he later premiered at Carnegie Recital Hall in 1966.

In the later 1960s he worked with Karlheinz Stockhausen on some of his compositions from the cycle Aus den sieben Tagen, and co-founded the free improvisation group New Phonic Art. From 1967 to 1976 he taught composition at the Musikhochschule in Cologne. In 1974, he joined IRCAM as the director of instrumental and vocal research, a job which he occupied until 1980.

He has conducted his compositions with Finnish Radio Symphony Orchestra, Orchestre philharmonique de Radio France, Jerusalem Symphony Orchestra, RTV Slovenia Symphony Orchestra, Warsaw National Philharmonic Orchestra, and Westdeutscher Rundfunk. From 1983 until 1999, he directed 20th-century music with the Orchestra Giovanile Italiana in Florence.

In 2002, Globokar was bestowed with the Prešeren Award for lifetime achievement.

Musical style
Globokar's music is notable for its spontaneity, energy, and innovative use of unorthodox instrumental and compositional techniques. His works often feature indeterminacy and improvisation, reflecting his own background in Jazz and free improvisation. His pieces employ a variety of extended techniques. For example, in his solo percussion piece Toucher, the performer narrates a story while simultaneously playing the syllabic patterns on a percussion array.

Works (selection)

Stage works 
  L’idôle  (2012) Music theatre for girls’ choir and four percussionists.  Text: Georges Lewkowicz 
  L‘armonia drammatica  (1987–1990) Music drama for orchestra, mixed choir, 7 singers and tenor saxophone. Text: Edoardo Sanguineti 
  Les Émigrés  (1982–85) Triptych 
 *  Miserere  (1982) for five narrators, Jazz trio and orchestra 
 *  Réalités / Augenblicke  (1984) for five singers, tape, film and slides 
 *  Sternbild der Grenze  (1985) for five singers, mezzo soprano, baritone and 18 musicians

Orchestra works 
  Radiographie d’un roman  (2009/10) for mixed choir (and seven soloists), accordion solo, percussion solo, 30 instrumentalists and live-electronic. Text: Vinko Globokar
  Mutation  for a singing orchestra. Text: Michael Gielen 
  Der Engel der Geschichte  
 * Part 1:  Zerfall   (2000) for two orchestral groups and tape playback
 * Part 2:  Mars  (2001/02) for two orchestral groups, tape and live-electronic
 * Part 3:  Hoffnung  (2003/2004) for two orchestral groups and sampler
  Les otages  (2003) for orchestra and sampler
  Les chemins de la liberté  (2003/05) for orchestra without conductor
  Anti-zapping  (2003/05) for orchestra
  Masse Macht und Individuum  (1995) for orchestra and four soloists
  Labour  (1992) for large orchestra
  Eisenberg  (1990) Orchestra version

Ensemble works and vocal music 
  Kaleidoskop im Nebel  (2012/13) for chamber ensemble
  L’Exil N° 1   (2012) for soprano (or tenor) and five instrumentalists. Text montage in seven languages by Vinko Globokar
  L‘Éxil N° 2   (2012) for soprano (or tenor) and 13 instrumentalists. Text montage in seven languages by Vinko Globokar
  Eppure si muove  (2003) for conducting trombonist and eleven instrumentalists
  La Prison  (2001) for eight instruments

Chamber music 
  Avgustin, dober je vin  (2002) for wind quintet
  Terres brûlées, ensuite...  (1998) for saxophone, piano and percussion (written for Trio Accanto)
  Discours IX  (1993) for two pianos
  Élégie balkanique  (1992) for flute, guitar and percussion
  Discours V  (1981) for saxophone quartet
  Discours VIII  (1990) for wind quintet
  Discours VII   (1986) for brass quintet
 Plan (1965) for flute, clarinet, oboe, trombone, and percussion

Solo works 
 NOTES (1972) for solo piano
 Voix Instrumentalisée (1973) for bass clarinet
 Toucher (1973) for percussion
 ?Corporel (1985) for percussion
 Oblak Semen (1996) for trombone 
 Dialog über Wasser (1994) for acoustic and electric guitar
 Dialog über Luft (1994) for accordion
 Dialog über Erde (1994) for percussion
 Dialog über Feuer (1994) for double bass

References

 Allied Artists.  (accessed on 21 April 2014).

External links
 Vinko Globokar page from IRCAM site (French)
 Interview with Vinko Globokar by Bruce Duffie, 20 November 2000
 Vinko Globokar Publisher's website: Vinko Globokar at Ricordi Berlin
 Article "Reacting" on compositional techniques related to interaction at IIMA

20th-century French composers
21st-century classical composers
Contemporary classical music performers
French classical trombonists
Male trombonists
Prešeren Award laureates
Gaudeamus Composition Competition prize-winners
1934 births
Living people
People from Meurthe-et-Moselle
Slovenian classical composers
Slovenian male musicians
Male classical composers
Slovenian jazz composers
Slovenian music arrangers
Academic staff of the Hochschule für Musik und Tanz Köln
French classical composers
French male classical composers
Members of the Academy of Arts, Berlin
21st-century classical trombonists
20th-century classical trombonists
21st-century French composers
Slovenian conductors (music)
Male conductors (music)
20th-century French male musicians
21st-century French male musicians
20th-century jazz composers
21st-century jazz composers